Costoanachis beckeri is a species of sea snail, a marine gastropod mollusk in the family Columbellidae, the dove snails. They are found along the eastern coast of South Africa.

Description
They are benthos and predators.

References

Columbellidae
Gastropods described in 1900